Gionfriddo is a surname. Notable people with the surname include: 

Al Gionfriddo (1922–2003), American professional baseball player 
Gina Gionfriddo (born 1969), American playwright and television writer